Roman Vasilyevich Denisov (born 15 March 1986) is a former Russian football goalkeeper.

Career
Denisov spent two seasons with Zenit U-21 team. In 2005 he played in Russian Football National League for Petrotrest.

External links
 Profile at stats.sportbox.ru 
 
 

1986 births
Living people
Russian footballers
Association football goalkeepers
FC Zenit Saint Petersburg players
FC Petrotrest players